Maria Liver (born 11 November 1990) is a Ukrainian swimmer. She competed for Ukraine at the 2012 Summer Olympics. Liver is the Ukrainian record holder in 50m breaststroke.

References

Ukrainian female swimmers
Swimmers at the 2012 Summer Olympics
Olympic swimmers of Ukraine
1990 births
Living people
Sportspeople from Poltava
Female breaststroke swimmers
Universiade medalists in swimming
Universiade gold medalists for Ukraine
Medalists at the 2015 Summer Universiade
21st-century Ukrainian women